Niemi is the 4th district of the city of Lahti, in the region of Päijät-Häme, Finland. It borders the districts of Mukkula in the north, Kivimaa in the east, Kiveriö in the southeast and Keski-Lahti and Kartano in the south, as well as lake Vesijärvi in the west.

The population of the statistical district of Niemi was 1,828 in 2019.

References 

Districts of Lahti